The narrow-body righteye flounder (Nematops macrochirus) is a flatfish of the family Pleuronectidae. Its natural habitat is the waters of the Indo-West Pacific, from the Bali Strait to Northern Territory, Queensland and New South Wales in Australia.

Etymology & taxonomy

The species name "macrochirus" is derived from the Greek: "macro" meaning "long", and "chirus" from "kheiros", meaning "hand".

Although Fowler described the long-fin righteye flounder, Nematops chui, in 1934, it has been shown that the morphology of N. chui overlaps completely with that of N. macrochirus, and that the long-fin righteye flounder is in fact a junior description of N. macrochirus as described by Norman in 1931.

Description
The narrow-fin right-eye flounder is, as its name suggests, a right-eyed flatfish. It has a slender body, almost three times long as it is wide, with large eyes and a small symmetrical mouth. The eyes have dark tentacles. The lateral line curves strongly above the pectoral fin, and the caudal fin is pointed. The upper (eyed) side is brown, with indistinct blotches on the fins and darker blotches on the caudal and pectoral fins. The underside is yellowish-white.

References

narrow-body righteye flounder
narrow-body righteye flounder